Regnery Publishing is a politically conservative book publisher based in Washington, D.C. The company was founded by Henry Regnery in 1947, and is now a division of radio broadcaster Salem Media Group. It is led by President & Publisher Thomas Spence. Regnery has published books by former Republican Party chairman Haley Barbour, Ann Coulter, Sarah Palin, former Speaker of the United States House of Representatives Newt Gingrich, columnist Michelle Malkin, Robert Spencer, pundit David Horowitz, U.S. Senator Ted Cruz, former U.S. Vice President Mike Pence and his family, U.S. Senator Josh Hawley, and Barbara Olson.

History
Regnery Publishing has existed as a series of companies associated with Henry Regnery. The first, Henry Regnery Company, was founded in Chicago in 1947 and split in 1977, forming Regnery Gateway Inc. and Contemporary Books Inc. Under the leadership of Henry Regnery's son, Alfred Regnery, Regnery Gateway became the modern-day Regnery Publishing.

Henry Regnery Company (1947–77)
After helping to found Human Events as a weekly newsletter, Regnery began publishing monthly pamphlets and books. Some of the first pamphlets he published, including a reprint of a speech by University of Chicago president Robert M. Hutchins, criticized the harsh treatment of Germans and Japanese both in popular attitudes and in postwar administration of the former Axis countries.

Regnery published the pamphlets and some books under the name Human Events Associates in 1946. He began publishing under his own name in September 1947. The first book published by the Henry Regnery Company was by socialist Victor Gollancz, who ran the Left Book Club in Britain. A man of Jewish heritage, Gollancz was appalled at the bombing of German civilians late in the war and by the treatment of the country afterward. Gollancz published In Darkest Germany in Britain but was unable to find an American publisher for his unpopular ideas. He approached Regnery, who agreed to publish it. Regnery subsequently published the U.S. edition of Our Threatened Values by Gollancz.

Regnery's third book was  The Hitler in Our Selves, by Max Picard. Other early books included The German Opposition to Hitler by the German nationalist Hans Rothfels and The High Cost of Vengeance (1949) by Freda Utley which was critical of the Allies' air campaign and post-war occupation. Utley's book was the first Regnery book to be reviewed in The New York Times, where it was excoriated. Reinhold Niebuhr gave it a positive review in The Nation magazine.

The company was founded as a nonprofit corporation. Regnery later wrote that it was initially organized that way, "not because I had any ideological objection to profits, but because, as it seemed to me then, and does still, in matters of excellence the market is a poor judge. The books that are most needed are often precisely those that will have only a modest sale." The Internal Revenue Service forced the company to be reorganized as a for-profit concern on March 1, 1948. Regnery hired his first few employees that year.

Conservative and anti-communist books
Regnery published some of the first and most important books of the postwar American conservative movement. "[I]t was a measure of the grip that liberal-minded editors had on American publishing at the time that Regnery, which was founded in 1947, was one of only two houses known to be sympathetic to conservative authors," according to Henry Regnery's 1996 obituary in The New York Times.

In 1951, Regnery published God and Man at Yale, the first book written by William F. Buckley, Jr. At that time, Regnery had a close affiliation with the University of Chicago and published classics for the Great Books series at the University, but he lost the contract as a result of publishing Buckley's book.

In 1953, Regnery published The Conservative Mind, a seminal book for post-World War II American conservatism, as well as books by Albert Jay Nock, James J. Kilpatrick, James Burnham and Whittaker Chambers. He also published paperback editions of literary works by authors such as novelist Wyndham Lewis and the poets T. S. Eliot and Ezra Pound.

In 1954, Regnery published McCarthy and His Enemies by William F. Buckley and L. Brent Bozell Jr. "Although Mr. Buckley [...] had criticized the senator for 'gross exaggerations,' Mr. McCarthy said he would not dispute the merits of the book with the authors," according to a news article in The New York Times. While criticizing McCarthy, the book was sympathetic to him (and in fact was harsher on McCarthy's critics than it was on the senator for making false allegations), and McCarthy attended a reception for the authors.

In the early 1950s, Regnery published two books by Robert Welch, who went on to found the John Birch Society in 1958. In May God Forgive Us, Welch criticized influential foreign-policy analysts and policymakers and accused many of working to further Communism as part of a conspiracy. In 1954, Regnery published Welch's biography of John Birch, an American Baptist missionary in China who was killed by Chinese Communists after he became a U.S. intelligence officer in World War II.

Regnery Gateway (1977–93)
In 1977, the Henry Regnery Company split, with Henry Regnery moving to Washington D.C. to form Regnery Gateway Inc. He took with him many of the Henry Regnery Company's rights to political, philosophical, psychological, and religious books along with a few select titles from other genres and the trademark for the Gateway Editions series. The original Henry Regnery Company remained in Chicago and was renamed Contemporary Books. Contemporary was purchased by Tribune Company and merged with Compton's Multimedia Publishing Group to form Tribune Education,  which was acquired in 2000 by McGraw-Hill.

In the 1980s, Alfred S. Regnery, son of Henry Regnery, took control of Regnery Gateway.

Regnery Publishing (1993–present)
In 1993, the Regnery family sold the publishing company to Phillips Publishing International, which put the book publishing company into its Eagle Publishing subsidiary, which also published the weekly Human Events. At that time, Regnery Gateway was renamed Regnery Publishing Inc. Alfred Regnery left his post as president of Regnery Publishing in the 2000s to become the publisher of The American Spectator magazine. Alex Novak, son of political columnist Robert Novak, is associate publisher of Regnery's history imprint.

One of Regnery's publishing lines is the Politically Incorrect Guide (P.I.G.) series of books, which present conservative views of historical or current events, such as the American Civil War, the British Empire, the Roman Catholic Church, Islam, immigration, and climate change.

In January 2014, Regnery was acquired along with other Eagle Publishing properties by Salem Communications.

On July 18, 2018, Simon & Schuster issued a press release announcing an international distribution agreement with Regnery Publishing to begin July 2018. According to the terms of the agreement, Regnery retained responsibility for sales of its titles within the United States while Simon & Schuster began to handle distribution in the United States as well as both sales and distribution in Canada and export markets around the world. 

After Senator Josh Hawley lost a publishing contract with Simon & Schuster in the aftermath of the 2021 storming of the U.S. Capitol for his role in objecting to the certification of the Electoral College results in the 2020 presidential election, Regnery Publishing said it would publish Hawley's book.

Reception
In describing Regnery's position in the publishing world, Nicholas Confessore, then writer for the American Prospect, wrote the following:
Welcome to the world of Regnery Publishing—lifestyle press for conservatives, preferred printer of presidential hopefuls, and venerable publisher of books for the culture wars. Call it—gracelessly but more accurately—a medium-sized, loosely linked network of conservative types, with few degrees of separation and similar political aims. Just don't call it a conspiracy.
Some reviewers have criticized the Politically Incorrect Guide books for their accuracy, with one calling The Politically Incorrect Guide to Darwinism and Intelligent Design "not only politically incorrect but incorrect in most other ways as well: scientifically, logically, historically, legally, academically, and morally." Chris Mooney criticized The Politically Incorrect Guide to Science as "The Incorrect Guide to Science." Peter Bacon of Harvard Political Review took issue with The Politically Incorrect Guide to the Civil War for its "cherry-picked research and one-sided judgments of figures." Historian David Greenberg called The Politically Incorrect Guide to American History "incorrect in more than just its politics" and that "it would be tedious to debunk."

Lawsuit over author royalties
In November 2007, Jerome Corsi, Bill Gertz, Robert (Buzz) Patterson, Joel Mowbray and Richard Miniter, five authors whose works have been published by Regnery, filed a lawsuit claiming that Regnery "orchestrates and participates in a fraudulent, deceptively concealed and self-dealing scheme to divert book sales away from retail outlets and to wholly owned subsidiary organizations" of Eagle Publishing, Regnery's parent corporation. Miniter said that meant that although he received about $4.25 a copy when his books sold in a bookstore or through an online retailer, he only earned about 10 cents a copy when his books sold through the Conservative Book Club or other Eagle-owned channels. On January 30, 2008, a federal judge dismissed all eight counts of the lawsuit because the authors had signed contracts with Regnery which included a mandatory arbitration clause in their contracts. The authors have sought arbitration with the company. In December 2011, the American Arbitration Association released its ruling on the arbitration case brought by three of the five authors (Miniter, Corsi and Mowbray) against Regnery. The ruling found in favor of Regnery on all counts.

References

External links
 
 Human Events' website
 Eagle Publishing's website

1947 establishments in Illinois
Book publishing companies based in Washington (state)
Conservative media in the United States
Privately held companies based in Washington, D.C.
Publishing companies established in 1947
 
Salem Media Group properties